Matt Wiesenfarth (born July 5, 1993) is an American soccer player.

Career 
Wiesenfarth played five years of college soccer at University of California, Davis between 2011 and 2015.

Following college Wiesenfarth appeared for Premier Development League side Burlingame Dragons in 2016, before moving to New Zealand to play for Canterbury United. He returned to California to play with NPSL club Sacramento Gold before returning to the Dragons, where he scored 13 goals in 11 games to earn a piece of the Western Conference scoring title.

On August 11, 2017, Wiesenfarth signed for United Soccer League side Sacramento Republic. After his contract was not renewed, he returned to Sacramento Gold before signing with the USL League Two's San Francisco Glens in May 2019.

References

External links 
 Sacramento Republic FC player profile
 

1993 births
Living people
Soccer players from California
American soccer players
Association football forwards
UC Davis Aggies men's soccer players
Burlingame Dragons FC players
Canterbury United players
Sacramento Republic FC players
USL League Two players
USL Championship players
Sacramento Gold FC players